Alexandar Lazarov (born 6 November 1997) is a Bulgarian professional tennis player. His highest singles ranking is No. 272 achieved on 14 November 2022, whilst his best doubles ranking is No. 359 achieved on 3 February 2020.

Professional career

2016: Professional debut, first ITF title
In 2016 Lazarov made his debut at ATP level at the ATP Sofia Open. He received a wild card for the qualification of the event in his homeland, losing in two sets to the world No. 214 Marius Copil. A month later Alexandar made his debut for the Bulgaria Davis Cup team against Turkey, losing the first match to Marsel İlhan, but claiming his maiden win over Altuğ Çelikbilek in the second. In September he won his first ITF singles title at the Serbia F8 event in Sokobanja, defeating Filip Veger in the final.

2017–2020: Maiden ATP main draw appearance & ATP Cup match win
Lazarov lost in the first qualifying round at the ATP Sofia Open in 2017 and 2018, but at the 2019 event the Bulgarian defeated Lukáš Lacko and Luca Vanni to guarantee himself a spot in the main draw for the first time. In his ATP tour main draw debut Alexandar faced former world No. 7 Fernando Verdasco, but failed to score another upset, losing to the Spaniard 2–6 1–6. After the tournament Lazarov made his Top 500 debut in the ATP rankings.

Alexandar won his second ITF singles title in 2018 at the Georgia F3 event in Telavi and a year later he added another trophy to his collection, defeating Jordan Correia in the final of the M15 event in Casablanca.

In January 2020, Lazarov participated in the Bulgarian team in the inaugural 2020 ATP Cup where the top 24 countries qualified based on the singles ATP ranking of their No. 1 country player. The Bulgarian team was No. 19 based on Dimitrov's ranking and part of Group C. Lazarov and Grigor Dimitrov pulled a victory in doubles where as the underdogs they stunned the top British experienced pair of Jamie Murray/Joe Salisbury in a close three sets match.

2021: ATP Challenger debut
At the beginning of the 2021 season Lazarov made the qualifying draw at the Antalya Open, but lost in three sets to Lucas Miedler. In July Alexander played his first ATP Challenger main draw match at the Iași Open after two wins in the qualification draw, but his run was stopped by Marius Copil. The Bulgarian's good form continued in the following week at the M25 event in Telavi, where he didn't lose a set on his way to his fourth ITF singles title.

In September, he received a wildcard for the main draw at the ATP Sofia Open, but could not score his maiden ATP win, losing 0–6 3–6 to Filip Krajinović. Lazarov finished his season with two consecutive ATP Challenger quarterfinals in Manama and in Antalya where he lost to the eventual champion Evgenii Tiurnev and reached a new career-high ranking of No. 405 on 13 December 2021.

2022: First ATP Challenger semifinal, Maiden ATP singles win, Top 300
In May Lazarov reached the quarterfinals of the Shymkent Challenger in Kazakhstan as a qualifier and as a result, he made his top 400 debut on 16 May 2022. Aleksandar continued his rise in the rankings during the summer after he won his fifth ITF title on home soil in Sofia as well as a final showing at the M25 event in Tbilisi the following week.

His best result to date came at the Rafa Nadal Open, where he made his way into the main draw and after five consecutive wins he reached his first semifinal on the ATP Challenger Tour as a qualifier. During his run in Manacor, Lazarov scored upset wins over world No. 132 Aleksandar Vukic and former No. 39 Mikhail Kukushkin before his run was stopped by the eventual champion Luca Nardi in three sets.

Ranked No. 334 at the 2022 Sofia Open, his home tournament, he won his first ATP tour level match and first against a top-100 player, overcoming world No. 74 Jiří Lehečka in straight sets. In the second round Lazarov player another spectacular match against World No. 30 Lorenzo Musetti and was just two points away from clinching his first ATP quarterfinal, but couldn't complete the upset, losing in three sets 7–6(5), 6–7(8), 2–6 to the Italian. At the same tournament in the doubles competition, he scored another ATP main draw win with Alexander Donski before losing in the quarterfinals to top seeds Fabio Fognini and Simone Bolelli.
After the success at his home ATP tournament, Lazarov went on to win back to back M15 events in Sozopol, where he defeated Vladyslav Orlov and Maks Kaśnikowski to claim his sixth and seventh ITF title respectfully and securing his debut in the Top 300.

On 23 November 2022, he was confirmed as a participant at the 2023 United Cup as part of the Bulgarian team.

2023: Historic Davis Cup qualification, ATP 500 debut
Lazarov opened his 2023 season with a debut appearance at the United Cup, where he won his mixed doubles match partnering Isabella Shinikova against former doubles No. 1 Elise Mertens and David Goffin, sealing Bulgaria's first win in the tournament with 3–2 over Belgium.

Alexander was also part of the Bulgaria Davis Cup team in their World Group I Play-offs tie against New Zealand, where he won his singles match against Ajeet Rai, helping his home country on their way to a 3–1 win that saw them qualify for the World Group I for the first time in history.

In February, Lazarov received a wildcard for the qualifying draw at the 2023 Dubai Tennis Championships, making his maiden appearance at the ATP 500 level. The Bulgarian grabbed this opportunity and made his way into the main draw after scoring his second Top 100 win against World No. 92 Zhang Zhizhen in the first round in straight sets and then overcoming World No. 108 Francesco Passaro also in straight sets for a spot in the main draw. As a result he moved more then 25 positions back into the top 275 in the rankings.

Challenger and Futures/World Tennis Tour finals

Singles: 9 (7–2)

Doubles: 6 (2–4)

National participation

Davis Cup (10 wins, 7 losses)
Alexandar Lazarov debuted for the Bulgaria Davis Cup team in 2016. Since then he has 9 nominations with 10 ties played, his singles W/L record is 6–3 and doubles W/L record is 4–4 (10–7 overall).

   indicates the result of the Davis Cup match followed by the score, date, place of event, the zonal classification and its phase, and the court surface.

ATP Cup (1 win, 2 losses)

United Cup (1 win, 0 losses)

Personal life
Lazarov is the son of former Bulgarian tennis player Krasimir Lazarov. He has a younger brother, George Lazarov, who is the youngest ATP ranked player up to date.

References

External links
 
 
 

1997 births
Living people
Bulgarian male tennis players
Sportspeople from Sofia
21st-century Bulgarian people